The full discography of American rock musician Myles Kennedy consists of fifteen studio albums, two concert films, four live albums, five extended plays, and thirteen singles in total, in addition to eleven studio tracks that he has appeared on as a featured artist, one of which was a single. Born in Boston on November 27, 1969, Kennedy is currently a member of the rock band Alter Bridge, with whom he has released four studio albums, two concert films, and several singles. He is also the frontman of Slash's touring group, and with Slash he has released a live album, Live in Manchester, the first of a series of live albums released throughout the summer of 2010, and Made in Stoke: 24/7/11, another live album released in 2011. In 2012, he released a collaboration studio album with Slash titled Apocalyptic Love, which is billed to Slash featuring Myles Kennedy and the Conspirators, as well as the 2014 follow-up titled World on Fire. With the Mayfield Four, he released two studio albums, two extended plays, and four singles; with Citizen Swing, two studio albums; and with Cosmic Dust, one studio album.

Albums

Studio albums

Live albums

Extended plays

Concert films

Singles

As featured artist

Notes:
 Kennedy performs lead vocals and rhythm guitar on acoustic versions of "Back from Cali,"  "Fall to Pieces," and "Sweet Child o' Mine" and lead vocals on a live version of "Nightrain," all of which can be found as bonus tracks on the deluxe version of Slash.

See also
List of songs recorded by Myles Kennedy

References

External links
Official Alter Bridge website
Myles Kennedy on Twitter
Myles Kennedy on Facebook

Rock music discographies
Discographies of American artists